This is a list of all sure genera, species and subspecies of the subfamily Crotalinae, otherwise referred to as crotalines, pit vipers, or pitvipers, and including rattlesnakes Crotalus and Sistrurus. This list follows the taxonomy as of 2007 provided by ITIS, which was based on the continuing work of Dr. Roy McDiarmid. with the addition of more recently described species.

Species list
 Agkistrodon, American ground pit vipers
 Agkistrodon bilineatus, Mexican ground pit viper
 Agkistrodon contortrix, Copperhead
 Agkistrodon contortrix contortrix, Southern copperhead
 Agkistrodon contortrix laticinctus, Broad-banded copperhead
 Agkistrodon contortrix mokasen, Northern copperhead
 Agkistrodon contortrix phaeogaster, Osage copperhead
 Agkistrodon contortrix pictigaster, Trans-Pecos copperhead 
 Agkistrodon howardgloydi, Castellana
 Agkistrodon piscivorus, Cottonmouth also known as the Water Moccasin
 Agkistrodon piscivorus conanti, Florida cottonmouth
 Agkistrodon piscivorus leucostoma, Western cottonmouth
 Agkistrodon piscivorus piscivorus, Eastern cottonmouth
 Agkistrodon russeolus, Yucatecan ground pit viper
 Agkistrodon taylori, Taylor's ground pit viper
 Atropoides, Jumping pit vipers
 Atropoides picadoi, Picado's jumping pit viper
 Bothriechis, American palm pit vipers
 Bothriechis aurifer, Yellow-blotched palm pit viper
 Bothriechis bicolor, Guatemalan palm pit viper
 Bothriechis guifarroi, Guifarro's palm pit viper 
 Bothriechis lateralis, Side-striped palm pit viper
 Bothriechis marchi, Honduran palm pit viper
 Bothriechis nigroviridis, Black-speckled palm pit viper
 Bothriechis nubestris, Talamancan palm pit viper 
 Bothriechis rowleyi, Mexican palm pit viper
 Bothriechis schlegelii, Eyelash viper
 Bothriechis supraciliaris, Blotched palm pit viper 
 Bothriechis thalassinus, Merendon palm pit viper
 Bothrocophias
 Bothrocophias andianus, Andean lancehead
 Bothrocophias campbelli, Ecuadorian toad-headed pit viper
 Bothrocophias colombianus, Colombian toad-headed pit viper
 Bothrocophias hyoprora, Amazonian toad-headed pit viper
 Bothrocophias microphthalmus, Small-eyed toad-headed pit viper
 Bothrocophias myersi, Chocoan toadheaded pit viper, Equis red snake
 Bothrops, American lanceheads
 Bothrops alcatraz
 Bothrops alternatus, Urutu
 Bothrops ammodytoides, Patagonian lancehead
 Bothrops asper, Terciopelo/Fer-de-lance
 Bothrops atrox, Common lancehead
 Bothrops barnetti, Barnett's lancehead
 Bothrops bilineatus, Two-striped forest pit viper
 Bothriopsis bilineatus bilineatus
 Bothrops bilineatus smaragdinus
 Bothrops brazili, Brazil's lancehead
 Bothrops caribbaeus, Saint Lucia lancehead
 Bothrops cotiara, Cotiara
 Bothrops erythromelas, Caatinga lancehead
 Bothrops fonsecai, Fonseca's lancehead
 Bothrops insularis, Golden lancehead
 Bothrops itapetiningae, São Paulo lancehead
 Bothrops jararaca, Jararaca
 Bothrops jararacussu, Jararacussu
 Bothrops jonathani, Cochabamba lancehead
 Bothrops lanceolatus, Martinique lancehead
 Bothrops leucurus, Bahia lancehead
 Bothrops lojanus, Lojan lancehead
 Bothrops marajoensis, Marajó lancehead
 Bothrops medusa, Venezuelan forest pit viper
 Bothrops monsignifer
 Bothrops moojeni, Brazilian lancehead
 Bothrops muriciensis, Murici lancehead
 Bothrops neuwiedi, Neuwied's lancehead
 Bothrops neuwiedi bolivianus
 Bothrops neuwiedi diporus, Chaco lancehead
 Bothrops neuwiedi goyazensis
 Bothrops neuwiedi lutzi, Cerrado lancehead
 Bothrops neuwiedi mattogrossensis, Mato Grosso lancehead
 Bothrops neuwiedi meridionalis
 Bothrops neuwiedi neuwiedi, Neuwied's lancehead
 Bothrops neuwiedi paramanensis
 Bothrops neuwiedi pauloensis, Black-faced lancehead
 Bothrops neuwiedi piauhyensis
 Bothrops neuwiedi pubescens, Pampas lancehead
 Bothrops neuwiedi urutu
 Bothrops oligobalius
 Bothrops oligolepis, Peruvian forest pit viper
 Bothrops osbornei
 Bothrops otavioi
 Bothrops pictus, Desert lancehead
 Bothrops pirajai, Piraja's lancehead
 Bothrops pulcher, Andean forest pit viper
 Bothrops punctatus, Chocoan lancehead
 Bothrops sanctaecrucis, Bolivian lancehead
 Bothrops sazimai, Franceses Island lancehead
 Bothrops sonene
 Bothrops taeniatus, Speckled forest pit viper
 Bothrops taeniatus lichenosus
 Bothriopsis taeniatus taeniatus
 Bothrops venezuelensis, Venezuelan lancehead
 Calloselasma, Malayan ground pit vipers
 Calloselasma rhodostoma, Malayan ground pit viper
 Cerrophidion, American mountain pit vipers (montane pit vipers)
 Cerrophidion godmani, Godman's montane pit viper
 Cerrophidion petlalcalensis, Godman's montane pit viper
 Cerrophidion sasai, Costa Rica montane pit viper
 Cerrophidion tzotzilorum, Tzotzil montane pit viper
 Cerrophidion wilsoni, Honduras montane pit viper
 Crotalus, Common rattlesnakes
Crotalus adamanteus, Eastern diamondback rattlesnake
Crotalus angelensis, Angel de la Guarda Island speckled rattlesnake
Crotalus aquilus, Queretaran dusky rattlesnake
Crotalus armstrongi, Western dusky rattlesnake
Crotalus atrox, Western diamondback rattlesnake
Crotalus basiliscus, Mexican west coast rattlesnake
Crotalus campbelli
Crotalus catalinensis, Catalina Island rattlesnake
Crotalus cerastes, Sidewinder
Crotalus cerastes cerastes, Mojave desert sidewinder
Crotalus cerastes cercobombus, Sonoran sidewinder
Crotalus cerastes laterorepens, Colorado desert sidewinder
Crotalus culminatus, Northwestern neotropical rattlesnake
Crotalus durissus, South American rattlesnake
Crotalus durissus cumanensis, Venezuelan rattlesnake
Crotalus durissus durissus, Cascabel rattlesnake
Crotalus durissus marajoensis, Marajoan rattlesnake
Crotalus durissus maricelae
Crotalus durissus ruruima, Mt. Roraima rattlesnake
Crotalus durissus terrificus, South American rattlesnake
Crotalus durissus trigonicus, Rupunini rattlesnake
Crotalus durissus unicolor, Aruba Island rattlesnake
Crotalus durissus vegrandis, Uracoan rattlesnake
Crotalus ehecatl
Crotalus enyo, Baja rattlesnake
Crotalus enyo cerralvensis, Cerralvo Island rattlesnake
Crotalus enyo enyo, Lower California rattlesnake
Crotalus enyo furvus, Rosario rattlesnake
Crotalus ericsmithi
Crotalus horridus, Timber rattlesnake
Crotalus intermedius, Mexican small-headed rattlesnake
Crotalus intermedius gloydi, Oaxacan small-headed rattlesnake
Crotalus intermedius intermedius, Totalcan small-headed rattlesnake
Crotalus intermedius omiltemanus, Omilteman small-headed rattlesnake
Crotalus lannomi, Autlan rattlesnake
Crotalus lepidus, Rock rattlesnake
Crotalus lepidus klauberi, Banded rock rattlesnake
Crotalus lepidus lepidus, Mottled rock rattlesnake
Crotalus lepidus maculosus, Durango rock rattlesnake
Crotalus mictlantecuhtli
Crotalus mitchellii, Speckled rattlesnake
Crotalus mitchellii mitchellii, San Lucan speckled rattlesnake
Crotalus mitchellii muertensis, El Muerto Island speckled rattlesnake
Crotalus molossus, Black-tailed rattlesnake
Crotalus molossus estebanensis, San Esteban Island black-tailed rattlesnake
Crotalus molossus molossus, Northern black-tailed rattlesnake
Crotalus molossus nigrescens, Mexican black-tailed rattlesnake
Crotalus molossus oaxacus, Oaxacan black-tailed rattlesnake
Crotalus morulus, Tamaulipan rock rattlesnake
Crotalus oreganus, Western rattlesnake
Crotalus oreganus abyssus, Grand Canyon rattlesnake
Crotalus oreganus caliginis, Coronado Island rattlesnake
Crotalus oreganus cerberus, Arizona black rattlesnake
Crotalus oreganus concolor, Midget faded rattlesnake
Crotalus oreganus helleri, Southern Pacific rattlesnake
Crotalus oreganus lutosus, Great Basin rattlesnake
Crotalus oreganus oreganus, Northern Pacific rattlesnake
Crotalus ornatus, Eastern black-tailed rattlesnake
Crotalus polisi
Crotalus polystictus, Mexican lancehead rattlesnake
Crotalus pricei, Twin-spotted rattlesnake
Crotalus pricei miquihuanus, Eastern twin-spotted rattlesnake
Crotalus pricei pricei, Western twin-spotted rattlesnake
Crotalus pusillus, Tancitaran dusky rattlesnake
Crotalus pyrrhus, Southwestern speckled rattlesnake
Crotalus ravus, Mexican pygmy rattlesnake
Crotalus ravus brunneus, Oaxacan pygmy rattlesnake
Crotalus ravus exigus, Guerreran pygmy rattlesnake
Sistrurus ravus ravus, Central Plateau pygmy rattlesnake
Crotalus ruber, Red diamond rattlesnake
Crotalus ruber exsul, Cedros Island red diamond rattlesnake
Crotalus ruber lorenzoensis, San Lorenzo Island red diamond rattlesnake
Crotalus ruber lucasensis, San Lucan red diamond rattlesnake
Crotalus ruber ruber, Red diamond rattlesnake
Crotalus scutulatus, Mojave rattlesnake
Crotalus scutulatus salvini, Huamantlan rattlesnake
Crotalus scutulatus scutulatus, Mojave rattlesnake
Crotalus simus, Middle American rattlesnake
Crotalus stejnegeri, Long-tailed rattlesnake
Crotalus stephensi, Panamint rattlesnake
Crotalus tancitarensis
Crotalus thalassoporus
Crotalus tigris, Tiger rattlesnake
Crotalus tlaloci
Crotalus tortugensis, Tortuga Island diamond rattlesnake
Crotalus totonacus, Totonacan rattlesnake
Crotalus transversus, Cross-banded mountain rattlesnake
Crotalus triseriatus, Dusky rattlesnake
Crotalus tzabcan, Yucatán neotropical rattlesnake
Crotalus viridis, Prairie rattlesnake
Crotalus viridis nuntius, Hopi rattlesnake
Crotalus viridis viridis, Prairie rattlesnake
Crotalus willardi, Ridge-nosed rattlesnake
Crotalus willardi amabilis, Del Nido ridge-nosed rattlesnake
Crotalus willardi meridionalis, Southern ridge-nosed rattlesnake
Crotalus willardi obscurus, New Mexican ridge-nosed rattlesnake
Crotalus willardi silus, Western Chihuahuan ridge-nosed rattlesnake
Crotalus willardi willardi, Arizona ridge-nosed rattlesnake
 Deinagkistrodon, Hundred-pace vipers
 Deinagkistrodon acutus, Hundred-pace viper
 Garthius
 Garthius chaseni, Mount Kinabalu pit viper
 Gloydius Asian ground pit vipers
 Gloydius angusticeps
 Gloydius blomhoffii, Japanese mamushi
 Gloydius blomhoffii blomhoffii, Japanese mamushi
 Gloydius blomhoffii dubitatus, Tung Ling mamushi
 Gloydius blomhoffii siniticus, Yangtze mamushi
 Gloydius brevicaudus, Short-tailed mamushi
 Gloydius caraganus, Karaganda pit viper
 Gloydius caucasicus, Caucasian pit viper
 Gloydius cognatus, Alashan pit viper
 Gloydius halys, Siberian pit viper
 Gloydius halys boehmei, Boehme's pit viper
 Gloydius halys halys, Siberian pit viper
 Gloydius himalayanus, Himalayan pit viper
 Gloydius huangi Gloydius intermedius, Central Asian pit viper
 Gloydius lijianlii Gloydius liupanensis Gloydius monticola, Likiang pit viper
 Gloydius qinlingensis Gloydius rickmersi Gloydius rubromaculatus Gloydius saxatilis, Rock mamushi
 Gloydius shedaoensis, Shedao island pit viper
 Gloydius stejnegeri, Gobi pit viper
 Gloydius strauchi, Strauch's pit viper
 Gloydius tsushimaensis Gloydius ussuriensis, Ussuri mamushi
 Hypnale, Humpnosed vipers
 Hypnale hypnale, Humpnosed viper
 Hypnale nepa, Sri Lankan humpnosed viper
 Hypnale zara, Lowlands humpnosed viper
 Lachesis, Bushmasters
 Lachesis acrochorda, Chocoan bushmaster
 Lachesis melanocephala, Black-headed bushmaster
 Lachesis muta, South American bushmaster
 Lachesis muta muta, South American bushmaster
 Lachesis muta rhombeata, Atlantic forest bushmaster
 Lachesis stenophrys, Central American bushmaster
 Metlapilcoatlus, Jumping vipers
 Metlapilcoatlus indomitus Metlapilcoatlus mexicanus, Central American jumping pit viper
 Metlapilcoatlus nummifer, Mexican jumping pit viper
 Metlapilcoatlus occiduus, Guatemalan jumping pit viper
 Metlapilcoatlus olmec, Tuxtlan jumping pit viper
 Mixcoatlus, Cloud montane pitvipers
 Mixcoatlus barbouri, Barbour's montane pit viper
 Mixcoatlus browni, Mexican montane pit viper
 Mixcoatlus melanurus, Black-tailed horned pit viper
 Ophryacus, Mexican horned pit vipers
 Ophryacus smaragdinus, Emerald horned pit viper
 Ophryacus sphenophrys, Broad-horned pit viper
 Ophryacus undulatus, Mexican horned pit viper
 Ovophis, Asian mountain pit vipers
 Ovophis monticola, Mountain pit viper
 Ovophis convictus, Indo-Malayan mountain pit viper
 Ovophis makazayazaya, Taiwan mountain pit viper
 Ovophis monticola monticola, Mountain pit viper
 Ovophis monticola zhaokentangi, Gaoligong mountain pit viper
 Ovophis okinavensis, Okinawa pit viper
 Ovophis tonkinensis, Tonkin pit viper
 Ovophis zayuensis, Zayuan mountain pit viper
 Porthidium, Hog-nosed pit vipers
 Porthidium arcosae, Manabí hog-nosed pit viper
 Porthidium dunni, Dunn's hog-nosed pit viper
 Porthidium hespere, Colima hog-nosed pitviper
 Porthidium lansbergii, Lansberg's hog-nosed pit viper
 Porthidium lansbergii hutmanni Porthidium lansbergii lansbergii, Lansberg's hog-nosed pit viper
 Porthidium lansbergii rozei Porthidium nasutum, Rainforest hog-nosed pit viper
 Porthidium ophryomegas, Slender hog-nosed pit viper
 Porthidium porrasi Porthidium volcanicum, Ujarran hog-nosed pit viper
 Porthidium yucatanicum, Yucatán hog-nosed pit viper
 Protobothrops Protobothrops cornutus Protobothrops dabieshanensis, Dabie Mountains pit viper
 Protobothrops elegans, Elegant pit viper
 Protobothrops flavoviridis Protobothrops himalayanus Protobothrops jerdonii, Jerdon's pit viper
 Protobothrops jerdonii bourreti, Bourret's pit viper
 Protobothrops jerdonii jerdonii, Jerdon's pit viper
 Protobothrops jerdonii xanthomelas, Red-spotted pit viper
 Protobothrops kaulbacki, Kaulback's lance-headed pit viper
 Protobothrops kelomohy, Omkoi lance-headed pitviper
 Protobothrops mangshanensis, Mangshan pit viper, Mt. Mang pit viper, Mang Mountain pit viper 
 Protobothrops maolanensis, Mao-lan pit viper
 Protobothrops mucrosquamatus, Brown spotted pit viper 
 Protobothrops sieversorum, Three horned-scaled pit viper
 Protobothrops tokarensis, Tokara habu
 Protobothrops trungkhanhensis, Trungkhanh pit viper
 Protobothrops xiangchengensis, Szechwan pit viper, Kham plateau pit viper
 Sistrurus, Pygmy rattlesnakesSistrurus catenatus, MassasaugaSistrurus catenatus catenatus, Eastern massasaugaSistrurus tergeminus edwardsii, Desert massasaugaSistrurus tergeminus tergeminus, Western massasaugaSistrurus miliarius, Pygmy rattlesnakeSistrurus miliarius barbouri, Dusky pygmy rattlesnakeSistrurus miliarius miliarius, Carolina pygmy rattlesnakeSistrurus miliarius streckeri, Western pygmy rattlesnake
 Trimeresurus, Asian lanceheads (tree pit vipers)
 Trimeresurus albolabris, White-lipped pit viper
 Trimeresurus andalasensis Trimeresurus andersoni, Nicobar mangrove pit viper
 Trimeresurus arunachalensis Trimeresurus borneensis, Bornean pit viper
 Trimeresurus brongersmai, Brongersma's pit viper
 Trimeresurus cantori, Cantor's pit viper
 Trimeresurus cardamomensis Trimeresurus erythrurus, Red-tailed bamboo pit viper
 Trimeresurus fasciatus, Banded pit viper
 Trimeresurus flavomaculatus, Philippine pit viper
 Trimeresurus flavomaculatus flavomaculatus, Philippine pit viper
 Trimeresurus flavomaculatus halieus Trimeresurus gracilis, Kikushi habu
 Trimeresurus gramineus, Bamboo pit viper
 Trimeresurus gumprechti Trimeresurus gunaleni Trimeresurus hageni, Hagen's pit viper
 Trimeresurus honsonensis Trimeresurus insularis, White-lipped island pit viper
 Trimeresurus kanburiensis, Kanburi pit viper
 Trimeresurus labialis, Nicobar bamboo pit viper
 Trimeresurus macrolepis, Large-scaled pit viper
 Trimeresurus macrops, Large-eyed pit viper
 Trimeresurus malabaricus, Malabar rock pit viper
 Trimeresurus malcolmi, Malcolm's pit viper
 Trimeresurus mcgregori, McGregor's pit viper
 Trimeresurus medoensis, Motuo bamboo pit viper
 Trimeresurus mutabilis Trimeresurus nebularis Trimeresurus phuketensis Trimeresurus popeiorum, Pope's bamboo pit viper
 Trimeresurus popeiorum barati, Barat bamboo pit viper
 Trimeresurus popeiorum popeiorum, Pope's bamboo pit viper
 Trimeresurus puniceus, Flat-nosed pit viper
 Trimeresurus purpureomaculatus, Mangrove pit viper
 Trimeresurus rubeus Trimeresurus sabahi, Sabah bamboo pit viper
 Trimeresurus salazar Trimeresurus schultzei, Schultze's pit viper
 Trimeresurus septentrionalis, Northern white-lipped pit viper
 Trimeresurus sichuanensis Trimeresurus stejnegeri, Stejneger's bamboo pit viper
 Trimeresurus stejnegeri chenbihuii, Chen's bamboo pit viper
 Trimeresurus stejnegeri stejnegeri, Stejneger's bamboo pit viper
 Trimeresurus strigatus, Horseshoe pit viper
 Trimeresurus sumatranus, Sumatran pit viper
 Trimeresurus tibetanus, Tibetan bamboo pit viper
 Trimeresurus trigonocephalus, Sri Lankan green pit viper
 Trimeresurus truongsonensis Trimeresurus venustus Trimeresurus vogeli Trimeresurus wiroti Trimeresurus yingjiangensis Trimeresurus yunnanensis, Yunnan bamboo pit viper
 Tropidolaemus, Temple pit vipers
 Tropidolaemus huttoni, Hutton's pit viper
 Tropidolaemus laticinctus, Broad-banded temple pit viper
 Tropidolaemus subannulatus, Bornean keeled green pit viper
 Tropidolaemus wagleri'', Wagler's pit viper

References

 
Crotalinae
Crotalinae